Universal Peace Foundation was a Palauan association football club which competed in the Palau Soccer League, the top-level league in Palau, in 2006–07, when they finished bottom of the league, losing all their games and ending with a -29 goal difference. Due to fragmentary records, it is not known how many other seasons they competed.

Players

2006/2007 Squad

References

Football clubs in Palau